Allan E. "Rubberarm" Russell (July 31, 1893 – October 20, 1972) was a professional baseball player.  He was a right-handed pitcher over parts of 11 seasons (1915–1925) with the New York Yankees, Boston Red Sox and Washington Senators.  For his career, he compiled a 71–76 record in 345 appearances, with a 3.52 earned run average and 603 strikeouts.  Russell played on the 1924 World Series champion Senators, making one appearance in the World Series, giving up one run over three innings of work.

He was a spitball pitcher who was allowed to throw the pitch after it was banned following the 1920 season. He was one of 17 pitchers exempt from the rule change.

He was born and later died in Baltimore, Maryland, at the age of 79.  His brother Lefty Russell also played Major League Baseball.

See also
 List of Major League Baseball annual saves leaders

External links

1893 births
1972 deaths
Major League Baseball pitchers
Baseball players from Baltimore
New York Yankees players
Boston Red Sox players
Washington Senators (1901–1960) players
Altoona Rams players
Reading Pretzels players
Baltimore Orioles (IL) players
Wilmington Chicks players
Richmond Climbers players
Reading Keystones players
Buffalo Bisons (minor league) players
Newark Bears (IL) players